Kora Pakhi was an Indian Bengali television soap opera that premiered on 13 January 2020, and airs on Bengali General Entertainment Channel Star Jalsha, and is also available on the digital platform Hotstar. The show was produced by Magic Moments Motion Pictures of Saibal Banerjee and Leena Gangopadhyay, and starred Parno Mittra and Rishi Kaushik.

The show marks the comeback of Parno Mittra on Bengali television after a decade and Rishi Kaushik's comeback after more than a year, since the end of his last show Kusum Dola, also helmed by Leena Gangopadhyay. Titas Bhowmik features as the parallel lead in this show.

This show deals with how to break stereotype, bullying, to break Taboo and about journalism.

Plot
Abandoned at birth, Amon has been raised as a tribal village girl and aspires to create an identity of her own as a journalist in one of Kolkata's leading newspapers. A chance encounter with the city-bred and jovial Ankur will change Amon's fate forever as love blossoms between the two while Amon's quest to find her roots and become independent continues. The story also revealed about Amon's birth identity as the daughter of Gulu and Bonny.

Cast

Main
 Parno Mittra as Amon Banerjee - Bonny and Gulu's estranged daughter raised by tribals, a journalist, Ankur's ex-wife
 Rishi Kaushik as Ankur Banerjee - owner of a tours and travels company, Amon's ex-husband, Medha's love interest
 Titas Bhowmik as Medha Sinha - Bonny and Mimi's adopted daughter; Ankur's friend, lover and business partner

Recurring
 Sumanta Mukherjee as Jadabendra Banerjee aka Jodu - Radharani's husband, Ankur's father
 Anashua Majumdar / Moumita Gupta as Radharani Banerjee - Jodu's wife, Ankur's mother
 Surojit Banerjee as Chitrabhanu Banerjee aka Bhanu - Jodu's younger brother, Nandini's husband, Ankur's younger paternal uncle, Ajaan and Ahaan's father
 Rajashree Bhowmik as Rangana Banerjee - Bhanu's wife, Ankur's younger aunt, Ajaan and Ahaan's mother
 Kushal Chakraborty as Agnibesh Banerjee aka Benu - Jodu's youngest brother, Suhasini's husband, Ankur's youngest paternal uncle
 Manjushree Ganguly as Suhasini Banerjee - Benu's wife, Ankur's youngest aunt
 Dwaipayan Das as Ahaan Banerjee  - Ankur's younger cousin brother, Bhanu and Nandini's younger son, Ajaan's younger twin brother, Bonolata's friend and love interest
 Aishwarya Sen as Bonolata Banerjee  - Ajaan's widow, Ahaan's friend and love interest
 Jyotsna Majumdar as Chandboni Soren aka "Chand Maasi" - Ankur's family's domestic help, Amon's fellow villager and wellwisher
 Debesh Ray Chowdhury as Parimal Hansda aka Pori - Rangta village's elder tribal man. He raised Amon and hence, he is her adoptive grandfather
 Rita Dutta Chakraborty as Mrinalini Sen aka Gulu - a popular author and college professor, Mimi's adoptive elder cousin sister, formerly Bonny's lover, Amon's estranged mother
 Bharat Kaul as Debdut Sinha aka Bonny - the managing director and creative head of one of Kolkata's leading newspapers, Mimi's husband, formerly Gulu's lover, Amon's estranged father, Medha's adoptive father
 Malabika Sen as Monidipa Sinha aka Mimi - Gulu's adoptive younger cousin sister, Bonny's wife, Medha's adoptive mother.
 Rahul Chakraborty as Surjo Sen - a senior journalist and Amon's well-wisher
 Sreya Bhattacharyya as Tuli - Bonny's sororal niece
 Diganta Bagchi as Ratna Sen - a lawyer, Bonny's friend
 Tathagata Mukherjee as Dweepjoy, a lawyer

References

Bengali-language television programming in India
2020 Indian television series debuts
2021 Indian television series endings
Star Jalsha original programming